The Panama City Center for the Arts, formerly the Visual Arts Center of Northwest Florida, is an art center in Panama City, Florida. Its development was part of downtown revitalization efforts. There is no connection to the VAC. 

The Center hosts shows of fine art, sculpture, jewelry and ceramics, as well as music and film events and classes.

The Panama City Center for the Arts is located at 19 East 4th Street in historic downtown Panama City. The building was originally Panama City's first city hall.

The Center for the Arts is managed by Bay Arts Alliance, a local non-profit arts agency of Bay County, and is partly supported by the city.

See also
List of museums in Florida

References

External links
Panama City Center for the Arts

Museums in Bay County, Florida
Buildings and structures in Panama City, Florida
Arts centers in Florida